Jack Hewitt (born July 8, 1951, Troy, Ohio), is a former racecar driver who was prolific in various open wheel and sprint car series. He was a two-time champion in the USAC Silver Crown Series in 1986 and 1987 and is second all-time in Silver Crown wins list with 23. In the USAC National Sprint Car series, he is 4th in all-time wins with 46. He also won the All Star Circuit of Champions championship in 1985 and his 56 wins in that series place him in the top 5 all-time.

Racing career 

Hewitt began his sprint car racing career in 1975 at Eldora Speedway, taking three wins in his inaugural season

He raced in the 1998 Indianapolis 500, placing 12th. After his venture into Indycars he returned to sprint cars until he had a very serious crash in 2002 from which he was lucky to escape with his life.

On September 26, 1998, Jack won the USAC Sprint, USAC Midget, USAC Silver Crown, and UMP Modified features at Eldora Speedway. By doing so he became the first and only driver to win all four divisions of racing at the 4-Crown Nationals held at Eldora Speedway in Rossburg, Ohio.

Jack Hewitt also made several trips to Australia during his career. He first appeared as part of the four man USA sedan teams that raced mainly at the Liverpool Speedway and Newcastle Motordrome during the late 1970s and early 1980s (while sometimes also driving Sprintcars). He won he 1980 Marlboro Grand National 100 lap event at Liverpool and later in the decade returned to Australia as a Sprintcar driver, winning the Grand Annual Sprintcar Classic at the Premier Speedway in Victoria in 1991 where he defeated fellow American Danny Smith, and leading Australian driver Max Dumesney.

Honors and awards 
Hewitt was inducted in the National Sprint Car Hall of Fame in 2002.
He is honored with an annual car race called the Jack Hewitt Classic at Waynesfield Raceway Park in Waynesfield, Ohio.  The Jack Hewitt Classic has been held in years past at the Kokomo Speedway in Kokomo, Indiana, and also at Attica Raceway Park in Attica, Ohio

Motorsports Career Results
(key)

USAC Silver Crown Series

All Star Circuit of Champions

World of Outlaws

American open-wheel racing
(key) (Races in bold indicate pole position; races in italics indicate fastest lap)

Indy Racing League

References 

1951 births
Living people
IndyCar Series drivers
Indianapolis 500 drivers
National Sprint Car Hall of Fame inductees
People from Troy, Ohio
Racing drivers from Ohio
World of Outlaws drivers
USAC Silver Crown Series drivers

PDM Racing drivers